Jeffrey Reginald Nedd (born 16 January 1957 in Oranjestad, Aruba) is a boxer who competed internationally for Aruba.

Career
Nedd competed at the 1988 Summer Olympics in Seoul, South Korea, he entered the light-heavyweight class but was stopped in the second round of his opening fight by Kenyan Joseph Akhasamba, so didn't advance any further.

In 2011 Nedd was the Aruba National Head Coach.

References

1957 births
Living people
People from Oranjestad, Aruba
Aruban boxers
Boxers at the 1988 Summer Olympics
Olympic boxers of Aruba
Light-heavyweight boxers